Gachua is a union in Sandwip upazila of Chittagong district in Bangladesh.

Geography 
Location of Gachua Union is in the northern part of Sandwip upazila. The distance of this union from Upazila Sadar is about 10 kilometers. Santoshpur Union is in the north of this union, Amanullah Union and Kalapania Union is in the west. It is bounded on the south by Bauria Union and on the east by Sandwip Channel, Syedpur Union and Muradpur Union of Sitakunda Upazila.

The area of Gachua Union is 3463 acres (14.08 km2). (As census of 2006)

Sandwip Channel on the east side of Gachua Union. There are also many small canals.

Population 
According to the 2011 census, the population of Gachua Union is 16,07. Of these, 7,128 are males and 8,950 are females.

Administrative structure 
Gachua Union is No. 3 Union Parishad under Sandwip Upazila. It is part of Jatiya Sangsad Constituency No. 270 Chittagong-3. Administrative activities of the union are under Sandwip police station. It is divided into 3 mouzas.

The villages of this union are:

 Hadia Para
 Mohammadpur Para
 Latif Bhuiyan Para
 Dhaner and Abur Go Para
 Saudar Go Para
 Chobi Rahman Para
 Roushan Ali Para
 Bereer Par Para

Education system 
Gachua Union has an average literacy rate of 48.63%. The union has 1 Fazil Madrasa, 3 secondary schools, 11 primary schools and 9 Ananda schools.

Educational institutions 

 Madrashas

 Katgarh Islamia Fazil Madrasa

 Secondary schools

 Abdul Khaleq Academy High School
 Gachua Adarsh High School

 Primary schools

 North Azimpur Government Primary School
 Kashem Market Government Primary School
 Gachua AK Government Primary School
 Gachua Ghatmajhir Hat Government Primary School
 Gachua South-West Government Primary School
 Gachua South-East Government Primary School
 Gachua Madhyapara Government Primary School
 Char Hudrakhali Government Primary School
 Dadan Shaheed Belayet Bir Uttam Government Primary School
 Sandwip Gachua Banglabazar Government Primary School
 Sandwip Gachua Scouts Government Primary School

Communication system 
The main road from Upazila Sadar to Gachua Union is the Sandwip-Gachua road. There is also Sarikait-Santoshpur road. Means of communication are taxi, motorcycle, rickshaw, bicycle.

Local markets 
The main market of Gachua Union are Ghatmajhir Hat, Akbar Hat, Haq Saheb Bazar, Bangla Bazar, Kashem Market and Banir Hat and some part of Ershad Market.

Illustrious personalities 

 M Obaidul Haque –– The first Member of Parliament for Sandwip.
 Belayet Hossain –– A heroic freedom fighter with the title of Bir Uttam.
 Master Shafiqul Alam –– Bir Muktijoddha and former chairman.

Public representative 

 Current Chairman: Mohammad Shamsuddin

 List of chairmen

References 

Coordinates on Wikidata
Unions of Sandwip Upazila